Róbert Matejov (born 5 July 1988), is a Slovak professional footballer who plays for Zbrojovka Brno  as a midfielder.

References

External links
 FC Fastav Zlín official profile
 Eurofotbal profile
 Futbalnet profile
 

1988 births
Living people
Slovak footballers
Association football defenders
FK Dubnica players
FK Slovan Duslo Šaľa players
FK Varnsdorf players
FC Fastav Zlín players
Slovak Super Liga players
Czech First League players
Association football midfielders
Expatriate footballers in the Czech Republic
Slovak expatriate sportspeople in the Czech Republic
Slovak expatriate footballers
FC Zbrojovka Brno players
Czech National Football League players